Dunagoil is a vitrified fort or dun on the Isle of Bute – an Iron Age hill fort whose ramparts have been melted by intense heat.  It stands on a volcanic headland and gives its name to the bay that it overlooks.  Like other places, such as Donegal, its name is from the Gaelic dún na gall – fort of the foreigners.

References

Citations

Sources

Hill forts in Scotland
Scheduled Ancient Monuments in Argyll and Bute
Isle of Bute